Budoji is an ancient book of Silla Korea, which testifies to the matricentric mytho-history of Koreans and East Asians in particular. By the fact that Mago (Magu in Chinese and Mako in Japanese) is defined as the Great Mother and the Creatrix, the Budoji champions the lost book of the Cosmic Mother. Its original text was alleged to have been written in the late 4th or early 5th century. Because its title is not verified in other texts of Korea or elsewhere, mainstream Koreanists have tacitly dismissed it as a forged text.

Budo (符都) literally means the emblem capital city, which refers to the confederacy of Old Joseon (2333-232 BCE), which comprises Three Hans. The Budoji, the matricentric text of ancient Korea, is caught in the crossfire of scholarly battles. As mainstream Korean historians regard Old Joseon as a mythical polity devoid of historicity, the mytho-history of ancient Korea that the Budoji offers may as well remain apocryphal at best. 

Reappeared in the mid-1980s with some Korean translations, the modern version of the Budoji is attributed to Bak Geum (박금), the modern scribe. Bak Geum retrieved it from his memory of translation and childhood reading in the wake of the Korean War and completed it in 1953. The original Budoji is told to be the first book of the 15 books entitled, Jingsimnok (Literature of Cleansing Mind/Heart),  documented or authored by Bak Jesang (363-419?) of Silla (57 BCE-932 CE). The Jingsimnok was kept and preserved as the treasure of the Bak clan throughout history. Bak Geum states that he wasn't able to bring with him the Jingsinnok in his home in North Korea, as he fled to the South to take refuge in Ulsan, Korea.

Scholarly works

The Budoji unfolds the forgotten mytho-history of ancient Koreans and East Asians. Characteristically, the cosmogonic story of Mago, the Great Mother and the Creatrix, takes the center stage of the Budoji. This book carries a stigma of an "inauthentic" text of Korea, together with such other books as the Handan Gogi (Old Histories of Han and Dan) and the Hwarang Segi (Chronicles of Hwarang) and therefore ignored by mainstream academics. Nonetheless, non-mainstream scholars and the public have increasingly studied and propagated this book in Korea and the United States. Among them are Jungpyeong Noh (노중평), Thomas Yoon, Seongje Jo (조성제), and Helen Hye-Sook Hwang. Hwang has published an article treating exclusively the Budoji.

Outline of Budoji
The Budoji offers an overview of the matricentric mytho-history of Koreans, the People of the Great Mother. According to the mytho-history of Magoism that Hwang provides, the Buodji concerns the Mythic Period, the Golden Period, the Budo Period, and a part of the Post-Budo Period. Magoist Korean polities take a form of confederacies up to the 4th century Silla.

The Mythic Period
The mythic period concerns the origin myth of Mago (마고 麻故). The divine lineage goes from Mago to her two daughters, Gunghui (궁희 穹姬) and Sohui (소희 巢姬) and two their eight daughters. Mago Halmi (Great Mother or Crone) is told to have eight daughters who became shaman progenitors. Thus they are called Nine Women/Maidens (Gurang). Helen Hye-Sook Hwang writes:

 In folk stories, the Nine Magos are referred to as Nine Women (九嫏 Gurang), consisting of the one (the Triad Creatrix) and the eight (HER eight daughters). The story of Nine Magos is told in different provinces of South Korea. The Temple of Gurang (Nine Goddesses 九嫏祠) in Buan, currently known as the Shrine of the Sea Saint (Suseong-dang 水 聖堂), is credited with the renowned story of Gaeyang Halmi (Grandmother/Goddess/Crone). The story goes that Gaeyang Halmi had eight daughters and sent them off to neighboring islands and that the eight daughters became the shaman progenitors in those regions. In another version, she sent out seven daughters to neighboring islands and lived with the youngest daughter.

These eight daughters are known as the four pairs of Heavenly Beings: Hwanggung (황궁 黃穹 Yellow Gung), Baekso (백소 白巢 White So), Cheonggung (청궁 靑穹 Blue Gung) and Heukso (흑소 黑巢 Black So). The mother of two Gungs (Hwanggung and Cheonggung) is Gungheui and the mother of two Sos (Baekso and Heukso) is Soheui. From these eight beings, first human ancestors are born. Hwanggung, the Head Shaman, leads the clan community of East Asians. The Hwanggung was succeeded by the Yuin (유인 有因). Upon assuming the leadership, Yuin inherits the Three Seal of Heavenly Emblem (천부삼인 天符三印 Cheonbusamin) and leads the clan community as the Head Shaman.

The Golden Period
The Yuin is succeeded by the Hanin and in turn by the Hanung. The Three Seals of the Heavenly Emblem passes through the Head Shamans. The governance of Hanung is referred to as the Way of Cheonung (the Heavenly Head Shaman).

The Budo Period
The Hanung is succeeded by the Imgeom better known as Dangun. The Imgeom or the Dangun commonly known as "Old Joseon" flowers the Way of Cheonung. The title of the book, Budo comes from the capital city of the Imgeom.

The Post-Budo Period
The Imgom declines due to the establishment and expansion of ancient patriarchal China. The legacy of Imgeom's Budo favorably called Samhan, Mahan, Byeonhan, and Jinhan. From them rise Baekje of  Byeonhan, and Goguryeo of Mahan, and Silla of Jinhan. Silla manages to establish a Magoist matriarchal republic.

Notes

References
 Bak, Jesang (1986). Budoji, scribed by Bak Geum and translated and commentated by Eunsu Kim.
 Hwang, Helen Hye-Sook (2018). “Mago, the Creatrix from East Asia, and the Mytho- History of Magoism.” Goddesses in Myth, History and Culture. Mago Books. pp. 4–31.
 Hwang, Helen Hye-Sook (2018). “Goma, the Shaman Ruler of Magoist East Asia/Korea, and Her Mythology.” Goddesses in Myth, History and Culture. Mago Books. pp. 252–276.
 Hwang, Helen Hye-Sook (2022). Mago Almanac: 13 Month 28 Day Calendar. Mago Books.
 Hwang, Helen Hye-Sook (2015). The Mago Way: Re-discovering Mago, the Great Goddess from East Asia. Mago Books.
 Hwang, Helen Hye-Sook (2020). The Magoist Cosmogony (Chapters 1-4) Budoji Workbook (Volume 1): The Budoji (Epic of the Emblem Capital City) in English and Korean Translations with the Original Text in the East Asian Logographic Language. Mago Books.
 JungPyeong Noh. GoChoson-ui Jonggyo Hyeokmyeong 고조선의 종교혁명 [The Religious Revolution of Old Choson] (Seoul: Daehan, 2003).
 Thomas Yoon. The Budozhi: The Genesis of MaGo (Mother Earth) and the History of the City of Heaven’s Ordinance (Notre Dame, IN: Cross Cultural Publications, Inc., 2003).

Pseudohistory
Silla
History books about Korea
Dangun